MGS and LRS are television stations owned by WIN Corporation in South Australia. Both are relays of ADS-10 in Adelaide, and brand as 10 SA.

Before 2004, SES was the only commercial television station broadcasting in Mount Gambier and the southeast of South Australia. The SES studios were located on John Watson Drive, Mount Gambier. RTS was the only commercial television station in the Riverland region of South Australia, with its studio on Murray Bridge Road, Loxton. Both stations broadcast a mixture of programs derived from the Seven Network, Nine Network, and Network Ten. The 2004 introduction of sole Network Ten affiliate, MGS and LRS, was the second commercial television station in the region – following this, SES/RTS became a sole Nine Network affiliate (until September 2007), only sports programs (particularly AFL matches) were acquired from the Seven Network.

At 9:00 a.m. on 15 December 2010, WIN Ten's analog signal was switched off, along with SES/RTS. The channels WIN SA, WIN Nine, and WIN Ten were renamed Seven SA, WIN SA and Ten SA. MGS/LRS is solely an affiliate of Network Ten.

10 News First updates bulletins regarding South Australian-specific news are presented by Rebecca Morse at ADS, Ten's Adelaide station, along with the national 10 News First breakfast and weekend bulletins. WIN merely produces short daily local bulletins through the MGS/LRS broadcast day.

On 1 July 2016, WIN Ten aligned with Network Ten after their program supply agreements through its affiliations with Seven Network to WIN Seven and Nine Network to WIN Nine expired. MGS/LRS also carry the Adelaide schedules of 10 Bold and 10 Peach through their secondary services.

On July 1, 2021, the channels Seven SA, Nine SA and WIN SA were rebranded as Seven SA, Nine SA and 10 SA went aligned with Seven Network, Nine Network and Network 10 respectively, after their program supply agreement through its affiliation with Network 10 to 10 SA.

See also

 WIN Television
 Network 10

References

External links
 WIN Television
 Network 10 website

WIN Television